The 2019 Italian Mixed Doubles Curling Championship was held from October 13, 2018 to January 27, 2019 in two stages: the group stage (round robin) from October 13, 2018 to December 28, 2018 and the playoff stage from January 25 to 27, 2019.

24 teams took part in the championship, with the best 8 teams promoted to the playoff stage.

The winners of the championship were the Amos Mosaner / Alice Cobelli team, who beat the Joël Retornaz / Angela Romei team in the final. The bronze medal was won by the Lorenzo Maurino / Emanuela Cavallo team, who won the bronze match against the Fabrizio Gallo / Anna Maria Maurino team.

Team Amos Mosaner / Alice Cobelli represented Italy in the 2019 World Mixed Doubles Curling Championship and finished in 18th place.

Teams

Round robin

Group A
(Qualificazione - Girone Pinerolo)
Was held in Pinerolo from October 13 to December 16, 2018

Group B
(Qualificazione - Girone Cembra)
Was held in Cembra from November 30 to December 28, 2018

Group C
(Qualificazione - Girone Cortina)
Was held in Cortina d'Ampezzo from December 17 to 28, 2018

Group D
(Qualificazione - Girone Sesto S. Giovanni)
Was held at the Palasesto venue in Sesto San Giovanni from October 29 to December 17, 2018

Playoffs
(Finale)
Was held as "double knockout" in Cembra from January 25 to 27, 2019

Stage 1

Stage 2

Bronze-medal match
January 27, 14:00

Final
January 27, 14:00

Final standings

References

See also
2019 Italian Men's Curling Championship
2019 Italian Women's Curling Championship
2019 Italian Mixed Curling Championship
2019 Italian Junior Curling Championships

Italian Mixed Doubles Curling Championship
Italian Mixed Doubles Curling Championship
Italian Mixed Doubles Curling Championship
Curling
Curling
Sport in Trentino